was opened in Nagasaki city in 1989 in honour of Philipp Franz von Siebold's great contributions to the development of modern science in Japan. The building is modeled on his former house in Leiden and is located next to the site of his original clinic and boarding school known as Narutaki Juku.

The museum displays 206 items classified into six categories describing Von Siebold's six-year stay in Nagasaki, the so-called "Siebold incident", and his great life work on Japan. It also exhibits his family tree and items about his beloved Japanese girlfriend Taki and their daughter Kusumoto Ine, who eventually became Japan's first female doctor.

External links 
 

Museums in Nagasaki
Science museums in Japan
Biographical museums in Japan
Museums established in 1989
1989 establishments in Japan